"Another Time, Another Place" may refer to:

Music
Another Time Another Place, a 1994 album by Matt Bianco
"Another Time, Another Place" (1958 song), by Jay Livingston and Ray Evans from the 1958 film
Another Time, Another Place (Benny Carter and Phil Woods album), 1996
Another Time, Another Place (Bryan Ferry album), 1974
"Another Time, Another Place" (Engelbert Humperdinck song), 1971, or the album of the same name
Another Time, Another Place: Timeless Christian Classics, a 2008 album by Avalon
Another Time, Another Place EP, a 2007 EP by Avalon
"Another Time, Another Place", a song by U2 from Boy

Film
Another Time, Another Place (1958 film), starring Lana Turner and Sean Connery
Another Time, Another Place (1983 film), starring Phyllis Logan
"Another Time, Another Place" (Space: 1999), an episode of Space: 1999

See also
Another Place, Another Time (disambiguation)